MacX is an obsolete display server implementation supporting the X11 display server protocol that ran on System 7, Mac OS 8, and Mac OS 9.  It also ran under A/UX. Prior to X11R4 and the introduction of the PowerPC-based Power Macintosh, this server was developed internally by Apple Inc. for the Motorola 68000 based Macintoshes. MacX was initially developed within the Networking and Communications organization as one component of the Apple DEC Alliance suite of products, but later was moved to Apple's A/UX group since X11 was (and is) an important part of UNIX user interfaces. Versions supporting X11R4 and X11R5 were developed for Apple by a small team of engineers at AGE Logic, Inc., a San Diego, California company. AGE also OEMed the MacX software under the trade name XoftWare for Macintosh. Apple provided early versions of the Power Macintosh to AGE Logic, and the result was a binary that supported both the Power Macintosh as well as earlier, 68000-based systems.

AGE Logic was later acquired by a Silicon Valley company named NetManage in the mid-1990s. NetManage was headquartered directly across the street from Apple in Cupertino, California. XoftWare for Macintosh was merged into NetManage's product offering for the Macintosh, which included a wide variety of standalone Internet desktop applications (e.g., telnet, archie search engine, gopher protocol, FTP), along with various software titles, mainly terminal emulators that were acquired by AGE Logic when it purchased Pacer Software earlier in the decade.

By 1998, Apple had discontinued MacX as it transitioned from the classic Mac OS to the Unix-like Mac OS X, which had ample support for X11 (earlier versions of Mac OS X did not directly support X11, but as of Mac OS X v10.3, X11.app has been made available directly from Apple). NetManage disbanded its Macintosh group earlier, around 1996, and as a result, discontinued support of XoftWare for Macintosh.

References

X servers